Ben Chester White (January 5, 1899 – June 10, 1966) was an African-American caretaker, uninvolved in the civil rights movement, shot down by the KKK. This was likely in an attempt to move focus away from James Meredith’s March Against Fear or to lure Martin Luther King, Jr. in an assassination attempt. This murder went unnoticed by King.

Biography

Early life 
For his whole life, Ben Chester White was a caretaker to the Carter family farm on Liberty Road in Natchez, Mississippi, as well as a deacon in the local Baptist church. He would perform tasks around the farm and with a limited ability to read would still quote vast passages from the bible.

Children 

 Jesse White - left to Baton Rouge
 Louis White - left to Vietnam

Death and afterward 
Ben Chester White was murdered by James L. Jones, Claude Fuller, and Ernest Avants of the KKK on June 10, 1966; he is buried in Southwood Lodge Church Cemetery, Natchez, Mississippi.

After buying Ben Chester White a soda, the three men took him into the Homochitto National Forest, ostensibly to help them find a lost dog, where he was shot eighteen times, dumped into Pretty Creek; the murderers burned the car in a planter's driveway across the county. Jones would be the one to soon after confess to the crime. Fuller and Jones were indicted but never tried, and Avants was acquitted (White's family later won a financial judgment that was never paid). Avants was retried and imprisoned later.

1968 - Jesse White sued the KKK for his father's death and was awarded $1 million from the court. This was the first time in history the organization was legally held responsible for one of its members. The $1 million was never received.

1989 - He is featured in the Civil Rights Memorial

2013 - Footage about White was shown in an episode of the documentary Civil Rights Movement Road Trip.

Further reading 

 Former Klansman Is Found Guilty of 1966 Killing
 The Ku Klux Klan: A History of Racism & Violence

References 

1966 in Mississippi
African-American history of Mississippi
Civil rights movement
1899 births
1966 deaths
People from Natchez, Mississippi